Rámi Méir (Ра́ми Ме́ир), full name Rahamim Nuvahovich Migirov – born (11 April 1962) in Azerbaijan, is an Israeli artist, poet, singer, author of song lyrics, idioms and parables. Meir is the chairman of Russia's Mountain Jewish Union of Artists.

Early years 
Rami Meir was born in a Mountain Jewish family on 11 April 1962 in Baku – capital city of the Azerbaijan Soviet Socialist Republic. In the 1990s he immigrated with his family to Israel, where he started learning Hebrew and other ancient languages to be able to read religious texts in the original: he thoroughly studied world religions including such books as Torah, the Quran, the Old and New Testaments, Kabbalah; he got acquainted with Hindu and Greek mythologies. Besides that, he began putting lost parables of different peoples into written form as well as creating parables, philosophical lyrics and idioms of his own.

Painting 
Rami Meir took up painting at Baku Art College while he was taught the skills of engraving of artistic goods and jewellery creating piece works on metal. During his first year of studying, he was elected by students to the internal school's commission focused on selecting students’ artworks for exhibitions of different level. All commission members were supposed to professionally appreciate art. Those new responsibilities inspired Meir to try working in various artistic fields with the use of all kinds of techniques.

Styles and features in painting 
Rami Meir makes paintings of realism, symbolism, impressionism, etc. The plots of some of his pictures are realistic, but set out by means of profound characters and symbols. That is the language Rami Meir uses to share with audience his great life experience and accumulated knowledge about the world including the role of human being in the entire Universe.

Working in realistic figurative style of painting he built up his own art language, that involves the use of a unique technique of 3-D strokes based on classic methods in combination with glazeglazing. The exclusive artist's feature of "golden stroke", with which each artwork by Rami Meir begins, reflects his special relationship to the creative process. Drawing paintings the artist tends to saturate them with a range of bright colors, which both imparts a positive sense and fills his works with high philosophical meaning. All of this allows us to consider Rami Meir as one of the most prominent figures in contemporary art in Russia and Israel.

Jewish studies and culture are one of the remarkable themes in his artworks. With the help of historical records, old postcards and photos he managed to explore main industrial arts, everyday life and traditional clothing of Mountain Jews from the Caucasus and South Caucasus regions and addressed all of that to his canvases, which formed a unique series of paintings called Mountain Jews.

The creativity of Rami Meir is not intuitive, it's the expression of author's rich knowledge acquired after many years of: studying world religions, wisdoms of great thinkers and religious figures, exploring the laws of the Universe as well as the laws and principles of the existence of any form of life. Rami Meir's artworks reflect the knowledge empowered with earth's energy to the globe.

3D strokes 
The innovative approach in Rami Meir's art is using the technique of ЗD strokes when making paintings, the result of being educated as engraver of artistic goods and jewellery.

He has developed a unique technique of Golden stroke and introduced it to creating painting process. This technique represents a sort of performancee for contemporary art.

Golden stroke 
The key secret about Rami Meir's pictorial artworks is the way of "golden stroke" «founding" before he starts writing each painting. The symbolism of the word "to found" perfectly captures the essence that the artist makes on canvas with first stroke. Rami Meir has created a system where the first brush on painting founds the content of the artwork being created in matter by the artist at that very moment, and fills it with living spirit. The main special thing of the technique is that the "golden stroke" must be founded by a female person on Rami Meir's canvas.

Rami Meir Art Studio in Moscow 
Today Rami Meir has his own gallery at Grand Furniture mall. Rami Meir Art Studio offers a collection of artworks: more than 60 paintings, chased items, sculptures made of wood and marble. There are about 180 canvases in total.

Music 
Rami Meir took a great interest in music during his school years when he was 11 years old: he started taking guitar and piano lessons at one of Baku's musical workshops. At the same age Rami Meir began writing poems and even then he made his first attempts to set the ones on music. But he made his career as author of song lyrics and singer in his mature years.

Rami Meir has released two studio albums in collaboration with Igor Timakov, – music maker and author of music to songs. They are working on their third record in 2020.

Special project: postcards with paintings 
In 2019 Rami Meir introduced a series of postcards with plots of his paintings just before the New Year. Some parts of them represent faces, handicrafts and clothing of Azerbaijan's Mountain Jews. The back side of postcards contains fragments from parables and idioms by Rami Meir. There are 21 postcards in this series totally. The author explained the message of it in the following way: I wish people would send postcards all over again! And through these postcards I want to make people have warm feelings and understanding of one thing: the dear and loved should be appreciated during their lifetime. I could help them express that wonderful feeling that they have inside them.

Creativity

Reviews 
The presentation of Hudo Kumek! Tiro Kumek! (God speed you! Torah speed you! ) music album as well as the exhibition of Rami Meir's paintings took place at Radisson Collection Hotel (Hotel Ukraina, Moscow) in 2019. The event was attended by Moscow's elite of Azerbaijani and Mountain Jewish ethnicities. Nisu Nisuev an artist and member of Moscow Union of Artists, thinks that Rami Meir is a very Multifarious person. A lot of his works have something in common with the style of first impressionists. The artist skillfully conveys his wealth of life experience into the language of fine art. His series of painting Mountain Jews is particularly impressive.Ephraim Amiramov, a singer, mentioned: Rami is a man of great talent. He is a poet, singer and artist. I'm inspired by everything he creates. Garri Kanaev, a music maker, stated: All what we saw and listened to performed by our friend Rami Meir at Hotel Ukraina in Moscow is a real feast of creative work.

Goals of creativity 
This is how Rami Meir explains the key goal of his creativity: I want to embellish the lives of others, to give them the light. I don't only mean the top layer of joy and impression out of nice image and well-done job, the main goal is very integral: to reflect how wonderful the world around us, how heavenly everything around us. It happens when a person comes up to the painting and sees that it lights up with a kind of internal warmth, which is put into the canvas by the artist. The energy of painting is the energy of artist. It makes you smile and feel the excitement of joy, it brings positive thoughts to your mind.

Fallout 
Rami Meir performed his service in the Soviet Army. Having found out his professional qualification, his commander ship introduced a new appointment called regimental engraver. In these two years of military service he created about 40 unique objects of art. Unfortunately, in 1983 the majority of those artworks were irretrievably lost during the transportation to all union exhibition held at VDNH (Exhibition of Achievements of National Economy).

Honours 
Rami Meir was elected as chairman of Russia's Mountain Jewish Union of Artists.

Family 
Rami Meir is married and has two children. His family lives in Israel.

References

Sources 
 Major forms, themes and motifs of the creativity of Rami Meir by Natalia Ivanova, PhD in Political Science, Winner of Tvardovsky National Literary Award Новости «Основные направления, темы и мотивы творчества Rami Meir» от автора Rami Meir
 Review of artworks by Rami Meir (an Israeli artist of Russian origin) by Vera Pereyatenets, fine art expert (certified by the Ministry of culture of the Russian Federation with the right to report on works of painting, graphics and applied art (17–20 centuries, Russia) Новости «Рецензия на творчество Rami Meir искусствоведа-эксперта В. И. Переятенец» от автора Rami Meir

External links 
 Official website Rami Meir
 Official page Rami Meir. Instagram
 Official page Rami Meir. FaceBook
 Rami Meir: Bakuvians are multinational aristocrats of the Caucasus
 Rami Meir – art creator: I am proud of being from Baku!
 Russia’s Mountain Jewish Union of Artists has been established
 Rami Meir, Mountain Jewish music star, presents his new album
 Mountain Jews in the art of Rami Meir
 The Bakuvian Rami Meir: I wish people would send postcards all over again!
 İncəsənət xadimi Rami Meir: Fəxr edirəm ki, bakılıyam!

1962 births
Living people
Azerbaijani emigrants to Israel
Israeli painters